The McKelvey–Schofield chaos theorem is a result in social choice theory. It states that if preferences are defined over a multidimensional policy space, then majority rule is in general unstable: there is no Condorcet winner. Furthermore, any point in the space can be reached from any other point by a sequence of majority votes.

The median voter theorem shows that when preferences are restricted to be single-peaked on the real line, Arrow's theorem does not hold, and the median voter's ideal point is a Condorcet winner. The chaos theorem shows that this good news does not continue in multiple dimensions.

Richard McKelvey initially proved the theorem for Euclidean preferences. Norman Schofield extended the theorem to the more general class of concave preferences.

The figure shows an example. There are three voters in the electorate, with ideal points A, B and C. Voters prefer policies that are closer to them, i.e. they have circular indifference curves. The circles show B's and C's indifference curves through a policy X. If a candidate were to propose X, then the other candidate could beat him by proposing any point in the yellow area. This would be preferred by B and C. Any point in the plane will always have a set of points that are preferred by 2 out of 3 voters. In fact, you can get from any point to any other point by a series of majority votes.

References

Social choice theory